The El Camino Real de los Tejas National Historic Trail is a national historic trail covering the U.S. section of El Camino Real de Los Tejas, a thoroughfare from the 18th-century Spanish colonial era in Spanish Texas, instrumental in the settlement, development, and history of Texas. The National Park Service designated  El Camino Real de los Tejas National Historic Trail as a unit in the National Trails System in 2004.

The modern highways Texas 21 (along with Texas OSR) and Louisiana 6 roughly follow the original route of the trail.

History

Alonso de León, Spanish governor of Coahuila, established the corridor for what became El Camino Real de los Tejas in multiple expeditions to East Texas between 1686 and 1690 to find and destroy a French fort near Lavaca Bay, established by René-Robert Cavelier, Sieur de La Salle on what de León considered to be Spanish lands. The route was refined in 1691-1692 by Domingo Terán de los Ríos, the first governor of Spanish Texas, in an effort to make better connections to the Spanish missions in East Texas. San Antonio de Bexar, founded in 1718, was the first of many communities built as way stations on the trail.

After Mexico achieved independence from Spain in 1821, immigrants from the American colonies invited to Texas used the corridor to travel to their settlements. A section of the road called Camino Arriba by the Spanish became known as the Old San Antonio Road. The growth of towns such as Austin, Galveston, and Houston not on the original route, along with the building of railroads, changed the direction of travel and trade and the use of El Camino Real de los Tejas diminished.

Route
The historic trail ran from the capitol and central Viceroyalty of New Spain — present day Mexico City — winding through Saltillo, Monterrey, Laredo (on the modern Texas border), San Antonio, and Nacogdoches, before reaching the Louisiana border at the Sabine River. The river crossing was a ferry, in use since around 1795, as the Chabanan Ferry. James Taylor Gaines purchased the ferry in 1819, and it became known as the Gaines Ferry. Gaines sold the ferry in 1843 and at some point it began to be called Pendleton's Ferry. The ferry remained in service until being replaced by the Gaines-Pendleton Bridge in 1937.

After crossing the river, the trail went through the Neutral Strip and Many, Louisiana, before ending at Natchitoches in modern Louisiana. The trail has a 2,500-mile length.  For centuries, the Native Americans had used the trail routes for trading between the Great Plains and Chihuahuan Desert regions and essentially created the road.  El Camino Real de Los Tejas was first followed and marked by Spanish explorers and missionaries in the 1700s. It was one of several named El Camino Real, or "Royal Road", that connected the Spanish possessions in North America with Mexico City.

Preservation
Interest in the road revived in the early 20th century.  In 1915, the Texas Legislature appropriated $5,000 to survey and mark the route, and professional surveyor V. N. Zivley was commissioned to make the study.  A few years later, the Daughters of the American Revolution placed granite milestones every 5 miles along the route to mark it.

In October 2004, President George W. Bush signed into law  El Camino Real de los Tejas National Historic Trail. The National Park Service started planning for El Camino Real de los Tejas National Historic Trail in 2006 with a comprehensive management plan.

See also
El Camino Real de Tierra Adentro – El Camino Real from Mexico to New Mexico
El Camino Real (California) – the California Mission Trail
Spanish missions in Texas
Presidio San Antonio de Bexar
Juan Bautista de Anza National Historic Trail

References

External links

 
 History of the trail
 El Camino Real de los Tejas National Historic Trail Association
 El Camino Real de los Tejas National Historic Trail – Texas Department of Transportation
Video footage of the El Camino Real de los Tejas National Trail from America’s Great Outdoors - Sabine National Forest (1992) on the Texas Archive of the Moving Image

Spanish Texas
Historic trails and roads in Texas
Historic trails and roads in Louisiana
Colonial United States (Spanish)
National Park Service areas in Texas
National Park Service areas in Louisiana
Protected areas established in 2004
2004 establishments in Texas
2004 establishments in Louisiana